Bally Sports Indiana (BSIN) is an American regional sports network owned by Diamond Sports Group, and operates as an affiliate of Bally Sports. The channel broadcasts local professional and high school sports coverage throughout the state of Indiana, with a focus on professional sports teams based in Indianapolis, namely the NBA's Indiana Pacers.

The channel is available on cable providers throughout Central Indiana, and is also available nationwide on DirecTV.

History

Bally Sports Indiana was launched as FSN Indiana was launched on November 1, 2006, as a spin-off channel of Fox Sports Midwest, after the regional sports network obtained the exclusive regional cable television rights to broadcast games from the Indiana Pacers NBA franchise. The first live sporting event broadcast on FSN Indiana featured the Pacers at the Charlotte Bobcats on the day of launch at 7PM. The game was preceded by the special Beyond the Glory:Reggie Miller and a one hour pregame show.

A high definition simulcast feed of Fox Sports Indiana, launched on December 17, 2007, which broadcasts in the 720p format.  Originally, the channel broadcast most of its Pacers game telecasts as well as Cincinnati Reds games from Fox Sports Ohio, and games and events broadcast nationally by Fox Sports Networks in HD. Today, nearly all programming is in HD.

On October 16, 2009, Dish Network removed Fox Sports Indiana and sister networks Fox Sports Midwest and Fox Sports Kansas City in a carriage dispute over a proposed increase in retransmission consent revenue paid by the satellite provider. The dispute lasted for one year, with all three channels being restored on October 29, 2010, through the signing of a new carriage agreement.

On December 14, 2017, as part of a merger between both companies, The Walt Disney Company announced plans to acquire all 22 regional Fox Sports networks from 21st Century Fox, including Fox Sports Indiana. However, on June 27, 2018, the Justice Department ordered their divestment under antitrust grounds, citing Disney's ownership of ESPN. On May 3, 2019, Sinclair Broadcast Group and Entertainment Studios (through their joint venture, Diamond Holdings) bought Fox Sports Networks from The Walt Disney Company for $10.6 billion. The deal closed on August 22, 2019. On November 17, 2020, Sinclair announced an agreement with casino operator Bally's Corporation to serve as a new naming rights partner for the FSN channels. Sinclair announced the new Bally Sports branding for the channels on January 27, 2021.  On March 31, 2021, coinciding with the start of the 2021 Major League Baseball season, Fox Sports Indiana was rebranded as Bally Sports Indiana, resulting in 18 other Regional Sports Networks renamed Bally Sports in their respective regions. The first live sporting event shown on Bally Sports Indiana was the Pacers-Heat game at 7 PM on that day. It was preceded by the "Pacers Live" pregame show at 6:30 PM.

On March 14, 2023, Diamond Sports filed for Chapter 11 Bankruptcy.

Programming
Bally Sports Indiana holds the regional cable television rights to the Indiana Pacers. The channel also broadcasts select Major League Baseball games from its sister regional networks, airing Cincinnati Reds games televised by Bally Sports Ohio, St. Louis Cardinals game telecasts originating from Bally Sports Midwest and Detroit Tigers games from Bally Sports Detroit to areas of the state within the home television territories of those teams as defined by Major League Baseball.

Bally Sports Indiana also broadcasts athletic events from the Missouri Valley Conference and Indiana High School Athletic Association.

On December 10, 2016, Fox Sports Indiana aired the first edition of Basketball Day Indiana, which comprised several high school, college and professional basketball games featuring Indiana-based teams. The event was broadcast annually until 2021.

Former Programming
Fox Sports Indiana previously had right to the Indiana Fever of the WNBA. It has carried telecasts of events and conference magazine programs from the Atlantic 10 Conference, Atlantic Coast Conference, Big East Conference, Big 12 Conference, Conference USA, Western Athletic Conference, and Horizon League. Additionally, it aired weekly magazine programs for Notre Dame's football and men's basketball teams.

Notable on-air staff

Indiana Pacers
 Chris Denari – Pacers play-by-play
 Quinn Buckner – Pacers analyst
 Eddie Gill – Pacers analyst (home games)
 Jeremiah Johnson – Pacers reporter

Indiana Fever
 Pat Boylan – Fever play-by-play
 Debbie Antonelli – Fever analyst

References

External links

Bally Sports
Fox Sports Networks
Sports in Indiana
Television stations in Indianapolis
Television channels and stations established in 2006
Companies that filed for Chapter 11 bankruptcy in 2023
2006 establishments in Indiana